Brachythecium mildeanum is a species of moss belonging to the family Brachytheciaceae.

It has cosmopolitan distribution.

References

Hypnales